Desmocerus californicus is the species of the Lepturinae subfamily in long-horned beetle family. This species is distributed in United States. The adult beetle feeds on the pollen of Sambucus species.

Subspecies 
 Desmocerus californicus californicus Horn, 1881
 Desmocerus californicus dimorphus Fisher, 1921

References

Lepturinae
Beetles described in 1881